The Chilean Rugby Federation is the governing body for rugby union in Chile.  The Federation is responsible for the various national teams representing Chile in international competitions.  The Federation is a member of several international organizations, such as World Rugby, and Sudamérica Rugby (the regional governing body for rugby in South America).  The Federation is led by President Francisco Davanzo Pumarino. The Federation includes over 18,000 players.

The Chilean Rugby Federation was founded 4 May 1953. The Federation joined the IRB (World Rugby) in 1991.

National teams
Chile's national team is known as the Condors. Chile has played in the annual South American Rugby Championship since the tournament began in 1951. Chile has finished in third place in the South American Rugby Championship (behind Argentina and Uruguay) almost every year since 1983.
Chile also participates in qualifying matches for the Rugby World Cup, but Argentina and Uruguay remain the only South American teams to have participated in the Rugby World Cup.

The Chile national rugby sevens team represents Chile in international rugby sevens tournaments.  Chile's rugby sevens team has played at the USA Sevens on the World Rugby Sevens Series, at the Rugby World Cup Sevens, and at the Pan American Games since rugby sevens was added in 2011.

The Chile national under-20 rugby union team has played in the IRB Junior World Rugby Trophy.  Chile finished second in 2008, and third in 2009 and 2013.  Chile hosted the tournament in 2008 and 2013.

Leadership

 1953 - 1955 Kenneth Dunford *
 1956 - 1957 Leonardo Mascaro V. *
 1958 - 1959 Rodolfo Pincas
 1960 - 1961 Rodolfo Pincas
 1962 - 1963 Jorge Chavez Sánchez
 1964 - 1965 Luis Felipe Mujica M. *
 1966 - 1967 Fernando De Castro *
 1968 - 1969 Leslie Cooper *
 1970 - 1971 Ronald Miles
 1972 - 1974 Patricio Campos N. *
 1975 - 1979 Luis Bernabo Ody
 1980 - 1982 Sergio Bascuñan Martinez
 1983 - 1986 Alberto Jory Walker
 1986 - 1987 Jorge Pizarro S.
 1988 - 1989 Sergio Bascuñan Martinez
 1990 - 1991 Alberto Jory Walker
 1991 - 1993 Claudio Cabrera Berceruelo
 1994 - 1995 Ernesto Sirner Bugueño
 1996 - 1997 Miguel A. Mujica Brain
 1998 - 1999 Julio Calisto Hurtado
 2000 - 2007 Miguel A. Mujica Brain
 2007 - 2008 Carlos Silva Echiburou
 2008 - 2009 Alastair MacGregor
 2009 - 2012 Sebastián Pinto
 2012 - 2015 Francisco Davanzo Pumarino
 2015 - 2019 Jorge Araya
 2019 - 2023 Cristian Rudloff

See also
 Rugby union in Chile
 Chile national rugby union team
 Chile national rugby sevens team
 Chile national under-20 rugby union team

References

External links
 Chilean Rugby Federation (official website)

Rugby union in Chile
Sports governing bodies in Chile
Rugby union governing bodies in South America
Sports organizations established in 1953